The E.J. Whitten Medal is awarded to the best Victorian player in an Australian rules football State of Origin football match. The award is named after Ted Whitten, also known as "Mr. Football", who played for and coached Footscray and was an advocate of interstate football. He played 29 games for Victoria, and coached the state side nearing his death of cancer in 1995.

 Note, in 2008 for the AFL Hall of Fame Tribute Match, Brendan Fevola was awarded the Allen Aylett Medal as the best player for Victoria.

References

Australian Football League awards
Australian rules football State of Origin